Greg Albritton (born March 18, 1952) is an American politician who has served in the Alabama Senate from the 22nd district since 2014. He previously served in the Alabama House of Representatives from the 64th district from 2002 to 2006.

In May 2019, he voted to make abortion a crime at any stage in a pregnancy, with no exemptions for cases of rape or incest.

References

1952 births
Living people
Republican Party members of the Alabama House of Representatives
Republican Party Alabama state senators
People from Conecuh County, Alabama
21st-century American politicians